The battle of Jolo, also referred to as the burning of Jolo or the siege of Jolo, was a military confrontation between the Moro National Liberation Front (MNLF) and the government of the Philippines in February 1974 in the municipality of Jolo, in the southern Philippines. 

It is considered one of the key early incidents of the Moro insurgency in the Philippines, and led numerous Moro leaders to resist martial law under Ferdinand Marcos.

MNLF forces initially managed to control the municipality, except the airport and an adjacent military camp. Government forces led by the 14th Infantry Battalion managed to regain control of the town. The United States military also reportedly participated according to both government and MNLF officials.

Narrative from the US Embassy 
According to a 1974 United States Embassy memo that was declassified by the United States Department of State in 2005, the following events occurred prior to, during, and after the siege:1.      Most serious fighting yet between gov't forces and Muslim rebels in Southern Philippines has occurred in Jolo City, the capital of Sulu Province. While picture still incomplete, following appears to be the progression of recent events:

a.      In January, Armed Forces of Phils (AFP) began increasing their forces on Jolo island in preparation for major offensive against estimated two thousand armed rebels belonging to Moro National Liberation Front (MNLF). Also in January, MNLF group took over several small towns in southern Jolo controlled by large group of former rebels who split off from MNLF and agreed to cooperate with GOP in December (See Manila 1740).

b.      In late January, MNLF rebels began to harass AFP units at Jolo City airport with mortar fire. Phil Air Force was forced to remove aircraft from Jolo to Zamboanga.

c.      On Feb 4 AFP forces landed on south coast of Jolo in attempt to retake several MNLF controlled municipalities.

d.      On afternoon of Feb 7, rebels attacked Phil Army units defending airport. Rebels almost succeeded in taking Army 4th Brigade headquarters located in Notre Dame College complex at airport but were repelled with AFP losing 19 killed and rebels 21, according to fragmentary reports. Airport was closed as result fighting. Phil military sources in Zamboanga City told an American observer that airport had been "lost" twice and retaken from rebels between Feb 7 and 9. Govt reinforcements were landed and fought through town to airport. AFP lost one F-86 and four helicopters were severely damaged. Embassy believes that AFP has since kept control of airport and driven most rebels from city. Defense Secretary Enrile and AFP Chief of Staff General Espino visited Jolo City on Feb 11.

e.      As fight for airport proceeded, mortar rounds and house-to-house fighting touched off small fires in tinderbox Jolo City. Napalm was dropped by Phil Air Force and may have added to fire, which quickly destroyed most of the town. Govt officials have claimed that rebels set torch to city.

f.       Chief of Police, whose forces reportedly fired in air rather than against rebels, is under arrest. Enrile told foreign press Feb 12 that Jolo City Mayor Barlie Abubakar left city with some of his police and retreating rebels and is being sought by AFP. Abubakar's son, Nizzam, may have died leading the MNLF attack.

2.      Embassy has no clear estimate of number of casualties. We assume that intensity of fighting and burning of city resulted in large number of military and civilian casualties.

3.      Fighting has produced many homeless refugees. AFP Intelligence Chief General Paz told embassy officer Feb 13 that 40,000 persons have been made homeless in Jolo City. Govt relief officials report that by Feb 10 some 6,000 refugees had been transported by coast guard boats to Zamboanga City and more have presumably been moved since. These add to 18,000 refugees from Jolo who were already in Zamboanga City, including those who foresaw the attack and were able to escape beforehand. Other refugees from fighting have presumably fled to Basilan and other nearby islands. Initial govt relief efforts include sending funds, Nutribuns and clothing for refugees in Zamboanga City.

4.      There has been no mention in local press of recent fighting in Jolo. Manila bureau of Associated Press has filed numerous reports which contain further details of situation.

5.      Comment: Impact that rebel attack on Jolo City may have on confused Sulu political situation still unclear. Fighting may polarize problem on this island even further and could force consolidation of disputing Muslim factions behind MNLF. If this occurs, it would leave AFP increasingly isolated and with reduced local support on island.

6.      Muslim rebels will probably be quick to blame the burning of Jolo City on policies of President Marcos, and recent developments will undoubtedly add fuel to criticism of GOP policy at next week's Lahore conference. Muslims in Sulu as well as Mindanao will have increased cause to believe that GOP desires military solution to Muslim insurgency, particularly since few of repeated govt promises for increased economic benefits for Muslim areas have been implemented

7.      In near term, immediate concern is that fighting may flare up in other troubled areas of south. Major trouble spots may be Zamboanga City, where overflow of embittered refugees is present, or in Cotabato area, where several thousand rebels may be tempted to take advantage of concentration of AFP forces in Jolo to launch new attacks.

8.      The policy of attraction which had been followed for past five months by SOWESCOM head Admiral Espaldon would also appear to be major casualty of renewed fighting. Although it is believed Espaldon opposed AFP operation on Jolo, he was apparently overruled by Manila. He will probably be retained with SOWESCOM but credibility of his policy of attraction will suffer as result recent events

Narratives from Witnesses

Abas Candao 
Dr. Abas Candao of Maguindanao, a UP College of Medicine graduate, Batch 1971, wrote the following journal entry of those days while assigned at the Sulu provincial hospital in Jolo:

Noor Saada 

Noor Saada writes in his article "KISSA AND DAWAT: The 1974 Battle of Jolo, narratives and quest for social conscience":

Said Sadain Jr. 
In his article "February 7, 1974: The Jolo-caust," Said Sadain Jr. wrote:Sadain Jr.'s narrative was cited by Dr. Michael Tan, former chancellor of University of the Philippines Diliman, in his article "From Jolo to Marawi":

Rehabilitation of Jolo 
One month after the end of hostilities, the Inter-Agency Task Force for the Rehabilitation of Jolo was created by virtue of Memorandum Order No. 411, s. 1974, as amended by Memorandum Order Nos. 426 and 450, composed of an Executive Committee and eight subcommittees: Overall and Long-Term Planning (later the Committee on Master Planning); Land Inventory and Reconstitution of Land Titles; Physical Infrastructures; Housing; Relief; Relocation and Resettlement; Trade, Industry and Agriculture; Banking and Financial Services; and Logistics.

Six years later, the Municipality of Jolo presented the following Citation to Rear Admiral Romulo Espaldon, who opposed military offensive in Jolo but was overruled by Manila, and later became member of the Executive Committee of the Inter-Agency Task Force for the Rehabilitation of Jolo:

Portrayals in media 
Journalist Criselda Yabes portrayed the burning of Jolo in her novel Below the Crying Mountain under the University of the Philippines Press in 2010. Yabes' novel won the University of the Philippines Centennial Literary Prize, and put Yabes on the Man Asia Literary Prize longlist.

References

Jolo 1974
Rebellions in the Philippines
1974 in the Philippines